Victor Sarin  (born 1945) is an Indian-born Canadian/American film director, producer and screenwriter. His work as a cinematographer includes Partition, Margaret's Museum, Whale Music, Nowhere to Hide, Norman's Awesome Experience, and Riel. He also directed such projects as Partition, Left Behind, and Wind at My Back.

Career
Vic Sarin is a Canadian filmmaker. The recipient of the Directors Guild Lifetime Achievement Award and the Kodak Lifetime Achievement Award, Sarin was recently appointed to the Order of Canada, the country’s highest honour, for his contribution to Canadian culture as a visual artist of extraordinary calibre.

Born in Kashmir, India, Sarin is a director, writer and cinematographer. With a body of work spanning over 100 feature films, documentaries and television specials across multiple genres, Sarin’s films have been nominated for and won Emmys, Genies, Geminis and Canada Screen.

Sarin’s films have screened at film festivals including TIFF, Cannes, Berlin, Tribeca, London, Shanghai, San Sebastian, Sydney, and Goa.

Sarin’s feature films include Partition, a period love story between a Muslim and a Sikh, set against the partition of India, starring Irrfan Khan and Neve Campbell, A Shine of Rainbows, a magical family drama starring Connie Neilson and Aidan Quinn that debuted at TIFF and Cold Comfort.

Sarin directed Millennium: Tribal Wisdom and the Modern World, for which he won an Emmy, The Boy from Geita, about the treatment of people with albinism in Tanzania, which was selected for a special screening at the United Nations, and Keepers of the Magic, which chronicles the magic of cinematography through such icons as Roger Deakins, Vittorio Storaro and Gordon Wills, who gave Sarin his final interview.

In 2003, Sarin co-founded Sepia Films.

Sarin’s career has been captured in the 2020 memoir, Eyepiece.

Filmography

Director
 Passengers (1980)
 You've Come a Long Way, Katie (1981)
 Cold Comfort (1989)
 Trial at Fortitude Bay (1994)
 Wounded Heart (1995)
 The Legend of Gator Face (1996)
 Hard to Forget (1998)
 Sea People (1999)
 Left Behind: The Movie (2000)
 The Waiting Game (2001)
 Love on the Side (2004)
 Murder Unveiled (2005)
 Partition (2007)
 A Shine of Rainbows (2009)
 A Mother's Nightmare (2012)
 Hue: A Matter of Colour (2013)
 A Daughter's Nightmare (2014)
 A Wife's Nightmare (2014 television film)

Writer
 A Shine on Rainbows
 Partition

Executive producer
 And the Beat goes On
 Civic Duty
 Love on the Side

Awards and accolades 
 2022 Order of Canada "for his long-standing contributions to the Canadian film and television industries as a renowned director, cinematographer and screenwriter."
 2008 Genie Award for Best Achievement in Cinematography - Partition - Nominee
 2007 Leo Award for Best Cinematography in a Feature Length Drama - Partition - Nominated
 2007 Leo Award for Best Direction in a Feature Length Drama - Partition - Nominated
 2007 Leo Award for Best Screenwriting in a Feature Length Drama - Partition - Nominated (with Patricia Finn)
 2006 Leo Award for Best Direction in a Feature Length Drama - Murder Unveiled - Nominated
 2001 DVD Exclusive Awards Video Premiere Award for Best Directing - Left Behind: The Movie - Nominated
 2000 Daytime Emmy Award for Outstanding Directing in a Children's Special - Sea People - Nominated
 1998 Daytime Emmy Award for Outstanding Directing in a Children's Special - In His Father's Shoes - Nominated
 1996 Genie Award for Best Achievement in Cinematography - Margaret's Museum - Nominated
 1993 Australian Film Institute AFI Award for Best Achievement in Cinematography - On My Own - Nominated
 1992 Emmy Award for Outstanding Individual Achievement - Informational Programming - Cinematography -  Millennium: Tribal Wisdom and the Modern World episode Strange Relations - Won (shared with Michael Boland)
 1990 Gemini Award for Best Photography in a Dramatic Program or Series - Love and Hate: The Story of Colin and JoAnn Thatcher - Won
 1990 Gemini Award for Best Photography in a Dramatic Program or Series - Divided Loyalties - Nominated
 1988 Gemini Award for Best Direction in a Dramatic Program or Mini-Series - Family Reunion - Nominated
 1988 Gemini Award for Best Photography in a Comedy, Variety or Performing Arts Program or Series - Family Reunion - Nominated 
 1987 Gemini Award for Best Photography in a Dramatic Program or Series - The Last Season - Nominated
 1986 Gemini Award for Best Photography in a Dramatic Program or Series - The Suicide Murders - Nominated
 1982 Genie Award for Best Achievement in Cinematography - Heartaches - Nominated

References

External links 
 
  Academy of Canadian Cinema and Television listing of wins/nominations by Vic Sarin
 NorthernStars.ca profile

1945 births
Canadian cinematographers
Film producers from British Columbia
Canadian television directors
Canadian male screenwriters
Indian emigrants to Canada
Living people
Canadian people of Indian descent
Primetime Emmy Award winners
Members of the Order of Canada
Writers from Vancouver
21st-century Canadian screenwriters